Sydney Youles Carter (28 July 1916 – 15 September 1978) was an English footballer who played as a centre forward in the Football League for Mansfield Town.

Carter was born in Chesterfield, Derbyshire, in 1916. He began his football career with Bolsover Colliery, and had spells on the books of Sheffield United and Wolverhampton Wanderers, without playing league football for either, before joining Macclesfield Town in 1937. In his only season with the club, he scored 40 goals from 39 appearances in the Cheshire League, a return that included 6 in Macclesfield's 8–4 defeat of Hurst.

He signed for Mansfield Town of the Football League Third Division North in May 1938, and established himself in the first team over the following season, but his career was disrupted by the Second World War. By the time the Football League resumed, he was 30. He returned to Mansfield and made a few more appearances in 1946–47, after which he joined the club's backroom staff, first as assistant trainer and then as trainer in his own right. Carter died in Mansfield in 1978 at the age of 62.

References

1916 births
1978 deaths
Footballers from Chesterfield
English footballers
Association football forwards
Bolsover Colliery F.C. players
Sheffield United F.C. players
Wolverhampton Wanderers F.C. players
Macclesfield Town F.C. players
Mansfield Town F.C. players
English Football League players
Midland Football League players
Mansfield Town F.C. non-playing staff